Chrysomya bezziana, also known as the Old World screwworm fly or screwworm, is an obligate parasite of mammals. Obligate parasitic flies require a host to complete their development. Named to honor the Italian entomologist Mario Bezzi, this fly is widely distributed in Asia, tropical Africa, India, and Papua New Guinea. The adult can be identified as metallic green or blue with a yellow face and the larvae are smooth, lacking any obvious body processes except on the last segment.

The fly feeds on decaying organic matter, while the fly larvae feed on the living tissue of warm-blooded mammals as opposed to necrotic tissue that many other fly larvae feed on. Since the larvae can cause permanent tissue damage, C. bezziana has led to much public concern. Management procedures include both prevention of colonization of the fly and treatment of a current infestation.

Chrysomya bezziana belongs to the genus Chrysomya, which contains species like Chrysomya rufifacies and Chrysomya putoria. C. bezziana and other members of this genus can be used to estimate the post-mortem interval in forensic entomology.

Geographical distribution 
Chrysomya bezziana is widely distributed throughout tropical areas in the Old World. It is most prevalent in Southeast Asia, tropical and subtropical Africa, some countries in the Middle East, India, the Malay Peninsula, the Indonesian and Philippine Islands, and Papua New Guinea. C. bezziana is not found at altitudes higher than 2500 meters above sea level.

In countries where Chrysomya bezziana does not exist, scientists and those in agriculture are worried that commercial flights, boats, or vehicles will distribute the fly. The climates C. bezziana thrives in are present in Australia and the Americas; the fly requires climates similar to its New World relative Cochliomyia hominivorax. Spread of the pest from Papua New Guinea to Australia has become a concern for Australia, as the presence of C. bezziana could cost livestock industries up to $500 million a year.

Characteristics 
Chrysomya bezziana belongs to the fly family Calliphoridae. This family comprises blow flies, carrion flies and cluster flies. Other parasitic screwworms are found in this family, such as Cochliomyia hominivorax and Cochliomyia macellaria.

Adult
The body of the C. bezziana adult is typically metallic green or blue. The face of these flies is typically yellow with soft fine yellow hairs. The length of an adult fly ranges between 8 and 12 millimeters. The abdominal tergites (the segments of the dorsal portion of the fly) have narrow darker bands and the legs are black or dark-brown. Only the bases of the wings are infuscated; the wings have a glassy appearance. The anterior spiracles (small openings on the surface for the respiratory system) range from dark-brown to orange.

Another close relative, Chrysomya megacephala, occurs in many of the same regions as C. bezziana; therefore, it is important to be able to distinguish between the flies. The male fly can be distinguished from Chrysomya megacephala by their eye facets. C. bezziana does not have a boundary dividing the upper and lower eye facets, while C. megacephala does have a boundary distinguishing the upper and lower portions. The female does not have as distinct differences and cannot be as easily distinguished from C. megacephala, but they can be identified by analyzing the frons (the uppermost part of the head of an insect). The frons of C. bezziana is more parallel, while C. megacephala has a frons that is distinctly narrow in the center.

Larvae
The third-instar larvae are smooth, lacking obvious body processes except on the last segment. The posterior spiracles are not hidden in the body cavity, and the peritreme of these spiracles is open. The larvae can be distinguished from its New-World relative C. hominivorax by observing the dorsal tracheal trunks. Those of C. hominivorax are darkly pigmented from the 12th segment to the 10th or sometimes 9th segment, while those of C. bezziana are only pigmented for the last half of the 12th segment. The anterior spiracle has 4-6 lobes, with 7 on occasion.

Life cycle 
The female lays approximately 150-200 eggs at a time. The eggs are laid in wounds and mucous membranes of a live mammal and will hatch after 24 hours. The larvae feed on living tissue and are especially attracted to blood. The larvae will feed on the host tissue for 5–7 days while they complete their development, then they will fall to the ground to pupate.

The pupal stage is temperature dependent with warm weather favoring growth. Depending on the temperature, the pupal stage can last anywhere from 1 week to 2 months. The males become sexually mature after 24 hours of leaving their puparium (the hardened shell the pupae mature in), while females take about 6–7 days to become fully sexually mature. If the weather is tropical (29 °C or 84.2 °F), the entire life cycle will last about 24 days; however, at cooler temperatures (below 22 °C or 71.6 °F), the life cycle can take 2–3 months to complete.

Medical importance 
Chrysomya bezziana usually infects livestock causing myiasis. Myiasis is the infestation of tissue (living or dead) on a living mammal by fly larvae. Mammals such as sheep, dogs, cattle, pigs, and even humans can become infested.

The adult female will lay her eggs on superficial wounds in live animals preferring wounds that are several days old. Eggs of C. bezziana are commonly laid in the navel of newborn livestock species or on castration wounds in cattle. Eggs are also laid on open sores, ulcers, scratches externally or on mucous membranes throughout the body. Wounds as small as a tick bite are large enough for a female to lay her eggs.

When the eggs hatch, the larvae burrow into the animal’s living tissue and feed on it. Their common name, the “screwworm”, is derived from the maggots that embed themselves into the flesh of their host in a screw-like fashion. The larvae can burrow as deep as  into the host’s living tissue. As the maggots feed and cause tissue damage, the wound produces a characteristic odor, which can go unnoticed by humans. However, this odor entices female flies to the wound and encourages them to lay their eggs there as well, causing further infestation.

C. bezziana is different from other fly species because tissue infestation can occur in the absence of necrotic tissue. The C. bezziana maggots may cause serious and permanent tissue damage. Extremely infested wounds can lead to death if not treated. The sexually mature adult imago feeds on decomposing corpses, decaying matter, excreta, and flowers. Due to their diet, these adult flies can be a mechanical vector for pathogens.

Forensic importance 
Forensic entomologists give a time that, at the very earliest, the corpse could have been colonized by insects instead of giving a time of death; this is because the time of colonization is not always concurrent with the time of death. They provide the shortest post mortem interval (PMI) possible.

The adults are attracted to decaying matter and thus they can be found on dead bodies. However, because C. bezziana can cause myiasis and lay its eggs on a live mammal, it can be more complicated to determine a time of colonization. If the fly laid its eggs and the maggots hatched prior to the death of the corpse and the forensic entomologist does not take this into account, the entomologist could give an incorrect time of colonization.

Public concern 

Because C. bezziana is an agent of myiasis, public concern has been raised over this fly. However, most human cases documented are debilitated patients not fully capable of taking care of themselves and dressing their own wounds. Caretakers of debilitated patients are encouraged to keep the environment the patient resides in clean. Keeping the area free of decaying organic matter, such as trash, decaying plants or excreta will prevent the flies from being attracted to the patient’s residence, and in turn, the patient. Caretakers should also practice good hygiene themselves to prevent bringing a screwworm with them. The public can take measures to protect themselves from this fly with basic fly-proofing methods like screens.

Wounds should be cleaned and dressed properly to prevent infestation of the fly, as C. bezziana is attracted to wound fluids and blood to lay her eggs in. If a person suspects that their animal or livestock has been a victim of fly-strike, they should bring the case to the attention of their veterinarian for analysis.

Management and control 
Management of Chrysomya bezziana can be conducted using several different methods, depending upon the adult or larvae form.

To remove and manage the infestation of larvae in the host, the larvae may be removed with forceps. This removal process should take place daily or as often as needed until the infestation is clear. These larvae can also be killed by applying proper insecticides to the infected areas and making sure the wounds are properly dressed. Organophosphorus insecticides like coumaphos, dichlofenthion, and fenchlorphos can be applied to wounds with fly larvae. These cause the larvae to leave the wound and fall to the ground, and the larvae will die without a host to feed on. Castration wounds in cattle that have insect growth regulators, such as dicyclanil, have high success rates of preventing the establishment of C. bezziana.

When trying to manage areas that have adult Chrysomya bezziana, one of the first tasks is to improve sanitation of the area. Many types of decaying matter serve as a food source and should be cleared out of the area. Adult flies can also be controlled by the use of insecticides. A few of the insecticides that are available for use in the management of adult C. bezziana include: ectopor, diazinon, nagasunt and coumaphos. When trying to prevent infestation of livestock and other animals, proper spraying and dipping with these insecticides can help in management control.

Sterile insect technique
The sterile insect technique (SIT), also known as sterile insect release method (SIRM), is a control method in which sterile insects are released to mate with other wild insects. Usually, the males are sterilized using radiation and then dispersed in a population to compete with wild males. If a sterile male mates with a wild female, she will produce no offspring, reducing the new population.

There have been studies involving Chrysomya bezziana and the sterile insect technique. In 1989, an experiment proved that SIRM had success rates similar to its New World relative Cochliomya hominivorax, which was successfully eradicated from North America in 1982. The success of SIT as an eradication method depends on the number of sterile insects released, on how competitive the sterile insects are in relation to their wild counterparts, and on whether the female insect mates multiple times. SIT is supported by the extensive use of pesticides. To this date, however, Chrysomya bezziana has not been eradicated using this method.

Vaccination
In 2000, vaccination of livestock against Chrysomya bezziana was explored. The results were promising in-vitro (outside of the body in controlled environments, like a petri dish) and in-vivo (tested with living animals). The animals vaccinated led to C. bezziana larvae with lower weights. The effects of larvae with lower weights could lessen the damage caused to the living tissue of the maggots, and it is possible that it could also reduce the fly development. The potential of vaccination as a control source was still unresolved, as the immunological mechanisms are very complex and follow-up studies need to be conducted.

Case studies 
A case study reported in 2009 involving Chrysomya bezziana included a 65-year-old woman with skin cancer. The woman had facial squamous cell carcinoma (SCC). A tumor developed as an ulcer on her left cheek and the woman did not keep the wound covered. When the ulcer began to spread, she did not seek any treatment for the myiasis for two years. Ultimately, the case was handled by removal of the larvae using forceps until about 60 larvae were removed. The patient was discharged and two days later returned to have 10 more larvae removed from her face. Infestation of Chrysomya bezziana in cancerous wounds is very rare and most of the cases deal with SCC among elderly patients.

Many cases among humans involve infestation of the oral cavity. Early reported cases of infestation of the mouth were found in India in 1946. According to the Communicable Diseases Watch newsletter, 11 of the 21 infestations in Hong Kong between October 2002 and December 2004 were in the oral cavity.

Another case study, reported in 2008, involved a 9-year-old boy in Indonesia. He was hospitalized due to maggots inside his right ear. The maggots were removed, and while the patient was recovering, it was noticed that the right eye was red. Upon examination, a maggot was found inside a lesion in the bulbar conjunctiva, and this maggot was then removed.

Current research 
According to a pest control officer for the Food and Hygiene Department in 2009, the Hong Kong government (where many of the case studies are published) is unaware of any research in this field. The most recent research done on this fly was published in January 2008 and involved identifying fly eggs using a scanning electron microscope for use in forensic investigations.

It is not a suitable fly for research in maggot therapy, because it can cause permanent damage by feeding on the underlying tissues, so most studies published on the subject do not include C. bezziana.

References

External links 
Pictures of Chrysomya bezziana
FEHD Chrysomya bezziana fact sheet
OIE

Calliphoridae
Parasitic flies
Insects described in 1914
Insects of the Middle East